Steven Henriques (born 2 June 1944) is a Jamaican sailor. He competed at the 1964 Summer Olympics and the 1968 Summer Olympics.

References

External links
 

1944 births
Living people
Jamaican male sailors (sport)
Olympic sailors of Jamaica
Sailors at the 1964 Summer Olympics – Dragon
Sailors at the 1968 Summer Olympics – Dragon
Place of birth missing (living people)